Live at the BBC is a compilation live album of the British progressive rock band Curved Air from sessions on:
 10 November 1970 (tracks 1-3) 
 5 January 1971 (tracks 4-5) 
 9 March 1971 (tracks 6-8)
 29 January 1976 in concert at Paris Theatre, London (tracks 9-13)

The album's liner notes give conflicting dates for the sessions. The prose section lists the dates as above, while a secondary listing dates tracks 1-3 as 28 April 1970, places track 6 in the same session as tracks 4-5, and provides the unlikely date of 27 January 1971 (just three weeks after the previous session) for tracks 7 and 8.

The album was released in 1995.

The songs "Thinking On The Floor" and "Stark Naked" were never recorded in the studio, while the lyrics for "Young Mother In Style" are different from those of the song "Young Mother" on their Second Album.

Reception

Allmusic said the album was "typical of BBC rock compilations, with alternate live radio versions that serious fans will find highly enjoyable, though more casual admirers will find the material unnecessary." They noted the solid sound quality and lightly praised the band's blending of classical, rock, and folk.

Track listing
"Vivaldi" (Darryl Way) – 6:25
"Propositions" (Francis Monkman)/"What Happens When You Blow Yourself Up" (Monkman, Sonja Kristina Linwood) – 5:23
"It Happened Today" (Monkman, Linwood) – 4:39
"Young Mother In Style" (Way, Linwood) – 5:14
"Situations" (Way, Rob Martin) – 5:38
"Blind Man" (Way, Martin) – 2:45
"Thinking On The Floor" (Way, Linwood) – 4:01
"Stretch" (Way, Monkman) – 4:34
"Stark Naked" (Way, Mick Jacques, Stewart Copeland, Phil Kohn, Linwood) – 5:44
"Woman On A One Night Stand" (Linwood, Norma Tager) – 5:43
"Midnight Wire" (Way, Tager) – 6:20
"Hot 'N' Bothered" (Jacques, Tager) – 3:02
"The Fool" (Way, Jacques, Tager) – 6:43

Personnel
 Sonja Kristina – vocals
 Darryl Way – violin, vocals 
 Francis Monkman – guitar, keyboards (tracks 1 to 8)
 Mick Jacques – guitar (tracks 9 to 13)
 Florian Pilkington-Miksa – drums (tracks 1 to 8)
 Stewart Copeland – drums (tracks 9 to 13)
 Rob Martin – bass (tracks 1 to 3)  
 Ian Eyre – bass (tracks 4 to 8) 
 Tony Reeves – bass (tracks 9 to 13)

Production credits
 Producer - Frances Line (tracks 7 to 8), John Muir (tracks 4 to 6), John Walters (tracks 1 to 3), Mike Appleton (tracks 9 to 11)
 Engineer - Bob Conduct (tracks 1 to 3), John White (tracks 4 to 6), Tom Corcoran (tracks 9 to 11)

References

External links

Curved Air albums
BBC Radio recordings
1995 live albums
1995 compilation albums